One and One Is One may refer to:

"One and One Is One" (song), a 1973 song by Medicine Head
One and One Is One (album), a 1999 album by Joi

See also
 One Plus One Is One, a 2004 album by Badly Drawn Boy
 1+1 (disambiguation), i.e., one-and-one